The Colonial Guard of Spanish Guinea or "Colonial Guard" and "African Colonial Guard" was a body that performed military, law enforcement and customs duties in Spanish Guinea, and garrisoned the colony from the early 20th century until the independence of Equatorial Guinea in 1968.

History

Origins 
The Colonial Guard was founded as a result of the Budget Law of 1908, which provided for replacement of garrisons of the Marine Infantry, the Civil Guard and the Customs office by a single body that could assume all the functions of these three. The objective of the Colonial Guard was to protect Spaniards settled in the colony.

At its creation, the Colonial Guard was composed of 430 European and indigenous personnel, which meant an increase of more than 12% in the number serving in the colony over the sum of the three bodies it replaced. The establishment of this first composition was set at 1 captain, 3 first lieutenants, 7 second lieutenants, 14 sergeants, 42 corporals and 1 cornet (all of them Europeans living in the colony and from the Civil Guard), 1 senior musician, also of European origin, as well as 12 cornets, 6 1st guards, 320 2nd guards, 6 1st musicians, 12 2nd musicians and 6 music learners (all of them indigenous).

1920s 

Through the 1920s, the Kingdom of Spain mounted military campaigns to subdue the indigenous Fang people in Río Muni; by 1926, garrisons of the Colonial Guard were established throughout the enclave, and the whole colony was considered 'pacified' by 1929.

Role in the Spanish Civil War 

At the outbreak of the Spanish coup of July 1936 and the commencement of the Spanish Civil War, the commander of the Colonial Guard, Lieutenant colonel Luis Serrano Maranges, revolted against the Second Spanish Republic and joined the Nationalist faction. His revolt meant that all of Spanish Guinea would end up joining the Nationalist faction in the subsequent military uprising. Nevertheless, part of the members loyal to the Republican faction, fleeing with their families by boat to Barcelona, were reintegrated into active duty with the same rank by the Republican government (according to the Government Bulletin of the Republic of 18 June 1937).

See also 

 Army of Africa (Spain)
 Spanish Legion
 Regulares
 Tiradores de Ifni

References 

History of Equatorial Guinea
Equatorial Guinea–Spain relations
Defunct gendarmeries
Defunct law enforcement agencies of Spain
Military history of Spain
Military units and formations of Spain
Military units and formations of the Spanish Civil War
1908 establishments in Spain
1968 disestablishments in Spain
Military units and formations established in 1908
Military units and formations disestablished in 1968